The 2010–11 season was the 101st season in the existence of AC Ajaccio and the club's fifth consecutive season in the top flight of French football. In addition to the domestic league, Ajaccio participated in this season's edition of the Coupe de France and the Coupe de la Ligue.

Players

First-team squad

Pre-season and friendlies

Competitions

Overall record

Ligue 2

League table

Results summary

Results by round

Matches

Coupe de France

Coupe de la Ligue

References

AC Ajaccio seasons
Ajaccio